Corn is a surname. Notable people with the surname include:

Alfred Corn (born 1943), American poet and essayist
David Corn, American political journalist and author
Kevin Corn, American voice actor
Rob Corn, American television producer and director
Rudolf Corn (born 1943), German footballer

See also
Korn (surname)